Deneside is an area in Seaham, County Durham, in England. It is situated to the west of Seaham.

References

External links
The most spectacular social success story was Seaham Urban District Council's provision of council houses to replace the festering 19th Century slums of the central area. From 1926 onwards, when infant mortality was double the County average, the mushroom growth of the Carr House Estate (Deneside) provided hope, homes with water closets, electricity, gardens and for the first time, recreational space for thousands. Milestones in its growth included two blocks of shops, a recreation ground in 1931, the All Saints Mission Church in 1932, old people's houses (the Lawns) in 1933, Deneside Park in 1935, new Infants and Junior Schools in 1935 and 1937. 6,700 people had been rehoused in ten years; health was much improved.

Villages in County Durham